Plotnikov (feminine: Plotnikova) is a Russian-language occupational surname derived from the occupation of carpenter (plotnik in Russian). Sometimes it may be transliterated as Plotnikoff.

The surname may refer to:

Aleksandr Plotnikov
Alexey Plotnikov, better known under stage name Lex Plotnikoff, Russian composer and guitar player
Andrey Plotnikov
Boris Plotnikov 
Igor Plotnikov
Ivan Plotnikov
Nikolai Plotnikov
Pavel Plotnikov, Soviet World War II pilot, twice Hero of the Soviet Union
Sergei Plotnikov
Vadym Plotnikov
Valeri Plotnikov
Vladimir Plotnikov — several people
William Plotnikov, Russian-Canadian boxer
Yevgeni Plotnikov
Klavdiya Plotnikova
Yelena Plotnikova
Irina Plotnikova
Jana Plotnikova

Russian-language surnames
Occupational surnames